The eastern carrion crow (Corvus corone orientalis, originally a separate species C.orientalis) is a member of the crow family and a subspecies of the carrion crow. The eastern carrion crow is found in Siberia from the Yenisei to Japan, south to Central Asia, Afghanistan, Eastern Iran, Kashmir, Tibet and northern China. They generally lay three to five eggs in trees or buildings. The eggs show no difference from the nominate subspecies.

References

External links
 

Corvus
Birds described in 1841